The law of reentry is a traditional rule in theatre that a character who is on stage at the end of one scene should not enter the stage at the beginning of the next scene. Writer Bill Bryson describes it as "almost the only 'rule' in London theatre that was still faithfully followed" in the time of Shakespeare. This, for instance, led to John of Gaunt in Richard II making an "abrupt and awkward departure [in the middle of a scene] purely to be able to take part in a vital scene that follows".

References

Theatre